Seahorse is a GNOME front-end application for managing passwords, PGP and SSH keys. Seahorse integrates with a number of apps including Nautilus file manager, Epiphany browser and Evolution e-mail suite. It has HKP and LDAP key server support.

PGP support is implemented utilizing GNU Privacy Guard. Passwords are securely stored encrypted with the user's login password using GNOME Keyring. Seahorse is released as free software under the GPL-2.0-or-later license.

Developers
Responsibility for maintenance and development of Seahorse has changed hands several times during its lifetime:
 Niels De Graef (3.29.x - present)
 Daiki Ueno (3.29.x - present)
 Nate Nielsen (real name Stef Walter) (0.7.4 - present)
 Jacob Perkins (0.6.x - 0.7.3)
 Jose C. García Sogo (0.5.x)
 Jean Schurger

See also

 Comparison of password managers
 List of password managers
 Password manager
 Cryptography
 GNOME Keyring

References

External links

 Project home page
 Seahorse repository on GNOME GitLab

Free password managers
Free software programmed in C
GNOME
OpenPGP
Software that uses Meson